The men's 74 kg (162.8 lbs) Semi-Contact category at the W.A.K.O. World Championships 2007 in Coimbra was the fourth lightest of the male Semi-Contact tournaments being roughly comparable to the middleweight division in Full-Contact's weight classes.  There were eighteen fighters from three continents (Europe, North America and Oceania) taking part in the competition.  Each of the matches was three rounds of two minutes each and were fought under Semi-Contact rules.   

As there were not enough men for a tournament designed for thirty-two, fourteen of the contestants had a bye through to the second round.  By the end of the tournament, Ireland's Robbie McMenamy won the gold medal, defeating Nikos Memmos from Greece in the final via points decision.  The bronze medal positions were taken by Canada's Jason Brown and Great Britain's Jacey Cashman.

Results

Key

See also 
 List of WAKO Amateur World Championships
 List of WAKO Amateur European Championships
 List of male kickboxers

References

External links 
 WAKO World Association of Kickboxing Organizations Official Site

Kickboxing events at the WAKO World Championships 2007 Coimbra
2007 in kickboxing
Kickboxing in Portugal